The Roark family is a fictional dynasty from Frank Miller's graphic novel series Sin City.

The family is made up of corrupt officials and landowners of Irish descent, who hold absolute power in Basin City.  They are the main antagonists in the series, and are frequent catalysts to various plots and storylines.  Several of their associates also serve as villains within the stories.

History
The family founded what would become Basin City during the Gold Rush, when a Roark ancestor brought with him a large number of foreign prostitutes to the gold mining camp. The prostitutes were immediately popular, turning a small camp into a thriving city.  Over the years, the prostitutes themselves eventually split from the family and formed their own district reserved specifically for prostitution. This red light district would later be known as Old Town.

In the time period of the comics, the Roark dynasty is currently thriving, with family members in the United States Senate, an Attorney General and a  Cardinal.

Family members

Cardinal Roark
Patrick Henry Roark, otherwise known as Cardinal Roark, appears in The Hard Goodbye as the brother of Senator Roark and Attorney General Roark and the uncle of Roark Junior.  According to Marv, he was once a doctor and priest serving in the medical corps during either World War II or the Korean War. He earned significant praise as a result and later became a Cardinal, gaining much political influence and extending the corruption within Basin City.  Marv also mentioned that the Cardinal's influence is what allowed his brother to become a Senator.

While serving the clergy, Cardinal Roark met Kevin, a cannibalistic young serial killer who mutilated and ate Old Town's prostitutes, believing he was devouring their souls. Convinced that Kevin has been spoken to by God, Cardinal Roark shelters him at the Roark family farm outside the city. He also joins in on Kevin's crimes, consuming parts of his victims' corpses.

The Old Town prostitute Goldie learns of these shocking crimes and prepares to inform the other prostitutes; she spends a night with Marv to gain his protection, but Cardinal Roark sends in Kevin to murder Goldie, and then frames Marv for the crime.  Marv then hunts down several members of the city's underworld to find Goldie's killer, eventually killing Kevin at the farm. In the end, he finally breaks into the Cardinal's bedroom. Cardinal Roark calmly and resignedly explains the story to Marv, who then proceeds to murder him. It is never actually shown how Marv kills him, but it's implied he breaks Roark's jugular with his thumbs.

In the 2005 film adaptation, Cardinal Roark was portrayed by Rutger Hauer.  Hauer was one of the last actors to be cast, completing his role several months after Mickey Rourke, who portrayed Marv, had finished shooting.  The only time they appear on-screen in the same shot is during their final confrontation, which was later edited in post-production utilizing both of their performances.

Senator Roark
Senator Ethan Roark is the main antagonist of Sin City. He is a rich and corrupt politician, who largely holds Basin City in his grip.  These privileges are inherited by his son, Roark Junior.  Senator Roark once beat his wife to death with a baseball bat, for which he was never arrested, even though (by his own admission) he left his fingerprints all over the crime scene.  He is the younger brother of Cardinal Patrick Henry Roark; the third brother serves as the US Attorney General (not featured in the story).

Senator Roark hopes for his son to one day become President of the United States, but Junior has a serious problem: he enjoys raping and murdering pre-teen girls. Senator Roark frequently uses his police connections to cover up his son's crimes, but when Junior kidnaps 11-year-old Nancy Callahan, Detective John Hartigan intervenes and shoots off Junior's ear, hand, and genitals.

Senator Roark then visits Hartigan in the hospital, smugly explaining that he actually has no intention of killing him whatsoever. Instead, he plans to finance Hartigan's medical treatment to keep him alive; his ultimate plan is to frame Hartigan for Junior's crimes while Junior slowly recovers from surgery. He also says that he can and will kill anyone to whom Hartigan tells the truth. Hartigan serves eight years in prison until he finally confesses to Junior's crimes, with the Senator personally appearing at his parole hearing.  During these years, the Senator had recourse to alternative medicines in order to heal his son and restore his reproductive organs, to eventually obtain an heir for his dynasty.

By the end of the story, Hartigan exacts his revenge on Junior; he then commits suicide, rendering Senator Roark unable to have his own revenge. In the final narration, Hartigan mentions that the Roark family line is ended, and the Senator's plans for a legacy destroyed (though there remains the third Roark brother, the Attorney General, he is not featured and has no visible connections with the city or his brothers, meaning Roark's nephews by him presumably would and could not fulfill Junior's role): Hartigan reflects as he dies that, with the Roarks eliminated, it is more likely that Sin City may one day change for the better.

Senator Roark was portrayed by Powers Boothe in the movie.  The role was also offered to Christopher Walken and Willem Dafoe, who both turned it down. Boothe reprises his role in the 2014 sequel, where he is the central villain in the two original stories.  In "The Long Bad Night," he is beaten at a high-stakes poker game by Johnny, a cocky young gambler who Roark realizes is his illegitimate son by an unknown prostitute though Roark contemptuously admits that he will only ever recognize his legitimate son, Roark Jr.  After Roark arranges for Johnny's hand to be broken, shoots him in the leg, and kills Johnny's companion Marcie, Roark is challenged again the following night.  Johnny defeats Roark again at poker and tells Roark that he will be haunted by the fact that he was beaten twice by the same man; Roark shoots Johnny dead and orders his men to dispose of the gambler's body.  In "Nancy's Last Dance," Roark is aware that Nancy Callahan seeks to avenge Hartigan's sacrifice by killing him, but dismisses her as an actual threat despite wishing to kill her for her role in Roark Jr's death.  Nancy, with the aid of Marv, is able to break into Roark's estate, where he gains the advantage after shooting her several times.  However, Roark is distracted by a shade of Hartigan, allowing Nancy to recover and kill Roark.

Roark Junior
Ethan Roark Jr. / the Yellow Bastard, is the son of Senator Roark and nephew of Cardinal Roark.  His public profile is that of a handsome young rich playboy; he is in fact a sadistic pedophilic serial killer who rapes and murders pre-pubescent girls. (It's implied that he "came by his proclivities honestly" at the Roark family farm.) These atrocities are frequently covered up by his father and the Basin City police department, but Detective John Hartigan is nevertheless determined to bring him to justice.  When Junior kidnaps the 11-year-old Nancy Callahan, intent on making her his fourth victim, Hartigan pursues him and kills his thugs before shooting Junior himself, blowing off his hand, his ear, and his genitals. Junior lapses into a coma as a result of these traumatic injuries.

As Junior undergoes years of surgeries to repair his limbs and genitals, Hartigan is framed for Junior's crimes and serves eight years in prison.  The surgeries leave Junior horribly malformed; he now has bright yellow skin, an oversized vertex, and emits a disgusting stench. His misshapenness do not prevent him from killing, however; during the eight years Hartigan is imprisoned, Junior rapes dozens of little girls. 

When Hartigan is freed from prison, Junior follows him to Kadie's Bar, where a 19-year-old Nancy is working as a exotic dancer. Hartigan wounds him in the neck as he follows them to a local motel, but he nevertheless bursts in, kidnaps Nancy and leaves Hartigan to die with his neck in a noose.

Junior takes Nancy to the Roark farm and begins lashing her with a whip, trying to make her scream before he rapes and kills her. However, Nancy refuses to scream during the torture, as she realizes that Junior is impotent unless he hears the victim's cries of pain. At this moment, Hartigan arrives and stabs Junior in the chest before tearing off his genitals a second time — this time with his bare hands — and smashing his head into a bloody yellow pulp. 

In the film, Junior was played by Nick Stahl, who also appears in flashbacks in the sequel, Sin City: A Dame to Kill For. In the latter film, his first name is revealed to be Ethan. In the comics, however, he has no first name and is referred to only as Roark Junior, Junior, or That Yellow Bastard.

Attorney General Roark
Attorney General Roark is the third unseen Roark brother that so far has not appeared in any Sin City stories.

Kevin
While not an actual member of the Roark family, Kevin nevertheless plays an important role in The Hard Goodbye as the hitman of Cardinal Roark.  An intentionally mute serial killer, Kevin hunts down and cannibalizes prostitutes in an attempt to "inherit" their souls and (he believes) save them from Hell.  He confesses these crimes to Cardinal Roark, after which the Cardinal begins to join in with him, believing that they are doing God's work.  Goldie soon learns of their rituals and seeks safety with Marv, but Kevin is nevertheless able to find Goldie and kill her. When Marv goes on a violent search for her killer, Kevin is one of his many casualties. Marv knocks out Kevin, feeds most of his body to his hungry pet wolf, and finally beheads him with a hacksaw. Kevin does not utter a sound throughout the torture, dying with a serene smile on his face.

Kevin also makes a cameo appearance during the climax of That Yellow Bastard, taking place four years before the events of The Hard Goodbye.  As John Hartigan murders Junior's guards, Kevin is seen quietly reading a Bible on the side porch.

Kevin was portrayed by Elijah Wood in the film adaptation, who never met Mickey Rourke on-set during filming.  As with Hauer, his shots were edited together with Rourke's.

Johnny
Appearing in the original story "The Long Bad Night" is Johnny, Sen. Roark's illegitimate son. Described as a cocky young gambler, he arrives in Basin City and heads to Kadie's place, where he immediately hits the jackpot on multiple slot machines. Taking a young waitress, Marcie with him as a good luck charm, he buys into the backroom poker game lead by the all-powerful Senator Roark. Johnny repeatedly wins in the high-stakes game, and cleans the senator out. One of the other players, the corrupt police lieutenant Liebowitz warns him to get out of town, but instead Johnny takes Marcie out for a night on the town. He is walking her home when he is attacked by Roark's goons. He fights them off and tells Marcie to meet him at a hotel before he is escorted into a waiting car. The Senator is waiting for him. In payment for the humiliations he suffered at the card game, Roarke takes back his money, then reveals a pair of pliers, which he uses to break three of Johnny's fingers. They toss him from the car and the Senator shoots him in the leg, at which point he reveals that he has recognized Johnny as his illegitimate son, but remarks that he only considered his dead son Roark Junior (who was killed during the events of That Yellow Bastard) his flesh and blood. He leaves Johnny alive, preferring to let him suffer, and Johnny swears revenge.

Johnny visits an unlicensed doctor, Kroenig who shoots up heroin before trading his services for Johnny's last forty dollars and his shoes. Realizing that he has left Marcie unprotected, Johnny flees to her hotel, but finds the Senator waiting for him along with Marcie's dismembered head and hands. Again, the senator lets him go. Intent on taking down Roarke, Johnny is able to scrounge a dollar from a sympathetic waitress Bertha which he uses to regain enough money playing slots to buy his way into Roarke's game the following night. Playing with significantly less confidence, Johnny folds his first few hands, allowing Roarke, who taunts him about his dead mother. He is able to once again con Roark into going all in, and then reveals his winning hand. Johnny taunts his father, reminding him that the story of how he was beaten twice by the same man will follow him for the rest of his life. His vengeance completed, Johnny smiles resignedly as Roarke shoots him in the head, commanding his men to get rid of the body.

He was played by Joseph Gordon-Levitt in Frank Miller's Sin City: A Dame To Kill For.

The Farm

The Roark family's farm is located on the corner of North Cross and Lennox, in an area of open farmland bordered by woods; it appears in several stories, including The Hard Goodbye, That Yellow Bastard, The Babe Wore Red and Hell and Back.  As well as many previous generations of the family, it was also home to Kevin since at least four years before the events of The Hard Goodbye; he is seen living there during the climax of That Yellow Bastard.  It is suggested by Hartigan that the deviant behavior of Junior and Kevin has been going on at the Farm for generations, as every cop in Basin City knows better than to stray too close to it.

The Farm consists of the following buildings and areas:-

Farmhouse - the main building, containing the living quarters.  The basement contains a tiled room where Kevin kept the heads of his female victims mounted on the wall.  This part of the farm was partially destroyed when Marv threw a petrol bomb through the window to smoke out Kevin.
Barn - An old wooden barn with a hayloft and sliding doors.  This is where Hartigan and Junior have their final confrontation in That Yellow Bastard, and where Wallace finds a nude and partially brainwashed Esther at the conclusion of Hell and Back.
A grain silo.
A workshed.
A deserted farmyard.  There is no obvious evidence of any traditional agriculture occurring here in what has to have been years, despite the presence of a tractor.  There is also a wood pile and chopping block with a hatchet embedded there, which Marv later takes as a weapon (see below).
The Woods - Heavy woodland that borders the Farm and the roads leading up to it.  The trees here are gnarled and twisted and the atmosphere is unsettling.  Both Marv (in The Hard Goodbye) and Hartigan (in That Yellow Bastard) sneak up to the Farm through the Woods, having driven up to a short distance from the road entrance, and Dwight defeats Fat Man and Little Boy here during The Babe Wore Red.  When Marv first passed through the Woods, he found them very disturbing, and his instincts told him at once that bad things had gone on at the Farm; by his second and final time at the Farm, however, he was no longer afraid and proceeded to use the Woods to his physical and tactical advantage during his duel with Kevin.  When Hartigan passes through, during heavy snow, he suffers what he thinks is another bout of angina, even though he was supposed to be cured of it.

Battles 

The following battles have also occurred at the Farm:
Hartigan vs. Armed Cops / Guards - That Yellow Bastard (Hartigan is armed with a switchblade, and several guns.  He stealthily kills two of them with the switchblade and the other two with the Beretta and the P22.)
Hartigan vs. Yellow Bastard / Roark Junior - That Yellow Bastard (Hartigan, whilst suffering a fake heart-attack, staggers into the barn where he is confronted and mocked by Junior.  He then collapses and as Junior moves in on him, pulls out a switchblade and stabs him.  He then castrates him with his bare hands before pounding his head into the floorboards, finally killing him.
Wallace and Jerry vs. Enemy Helicopter - Hell and Back (Wallace is prepared for this by wearing a Kevlar vest which shields him and Esther, whom he arrived to rescue.  The helicopter is shot out of the sky by Jerry, armed with a TOW missile).
Marv vs. Kevin - The Hard Goodbye (Despite Marv's brute strength and durability, Kevin gets the drop on him and disarms/blinds him with his sharp fingernails before knocking him out with a sledgehammer).
Marv vs. Armed Cops - The Hard Goodbye (Marv manages to wipe out a whole squad of heavily armed cops whilst armed only with a hatchet).
Marv vs. Kevin II - The Hard Goodbye (Marv manages to trap Kevin, handcuff himself to him and knock him out with one punch, before proceeding to methodically dismember Kevin with a hacksaw).
Dwight vs. Fat Man and Little Boy - The Babe Wore Red (Dwight and the 'babe' are chased to the farm, where, upon being cornered, Dwight subdues them by hand and feet, before shooting them in the legs).

Comics characters introduced in 1991
Crime film characters
Fictional families
Sin City characters
Characters created by Frank Miller (comics)